Despotović is a Serbian surname, derived from word despot ("master, lord"). Notable people with the surname include:

Đorđe Despotović (born 1992), Serbian footballer
Frane Despotović (born 1982), Croatian futsal player
Jelena Despotović (born 1994), Montenegrin handball player
Jovan Despotović (born 1952), Serbian art historian and critic
Petar Despotović (born 1988), Serbian basketball player
Ranko Despotović (born 1983), Serbian footballer
Veljko Despotović (1931–2013), Serbian film and television production designer
Vesna Despotović (born 1961), Serbian basketball player

Serbian surnames